Goran Bogdanović may refer to:

 Goran Bogdanović (politician) (born 1963), Serbian politician and former Minister for Kosovo and Metohija
 Goran Bogdanović (footballer born 1967), retired Serbian footballer